Artrocker is a UK-based collective involved in music promotion and publishing. It was started by Paul Cox and Tom Fawcett who had been co-promoters of a London night called The Sausage Machine. Having started life with an online newsletter and event promotion in 2001, it has since expanded into various endeavours including a monthly magazine, various websites, a record label, video production, and a weekly radio show.
Artrocker has a reputation for talent-spotting and supporting bands before they become well known. They were the first promoters to bring the Yeah Yeah Yeahs and The Black Keys to the UK and the first to put on concerts in London by The Datsuns, Maxïmo Park, and The Futureheads.

Magazine 

Artrocker launched a bi-weekly magazine in October 2004. It has since become a monthly title.

Websites 
Artrocker.com is the original Artrocker website and was created as an offshoot of the online newsletter in 2002.  It split from the magazine in 2008 and now runs independently of that publication.

Artrocker.tv is the official Artrocker magazine website.

Events 
Artrocker hosts regular club nights in London and Brighton. It also participates in various large-scale events, notably the Underage festivals.

Radio 
Paul Artrocker presents a weekly show on Resonance.fm which is also syndicated online.

Record label 
The Artrocker label is now defunct. It was host to such bands as The Gin Palace, Ten Benson, Mighty Fraff, Electric Shocks, The Hells and The Hotwires.

2013 staff 
Editor - Tom Fawcett
Commercial Director - Chris Hornby
Artrocker Radio - Paul Cox
Designer - Richard Lucas
Advertising Manager - Alan Thomas
Reviews & Online Editor - Luke Lipski
New Blood Editor - Michael Jamison 
Festivals Editor - Sam Briggs

References

External links
Artrocker.com
Artrocker.tv
ArtrockerTV YouTube channel
Artrockers Magazine's MySpace
Artrocker Club
BBC feature on Artrocker

Music companies of the United Kingdom